The first New Zealand Legislative Council, also known as the General Legislative Council, was established in 1841 when New Zealand was created as a Crown colony separate from New South Wales. The Legislative Council consisted of the governor, the colonial secretary, the colonial treasurer, and senior justices of the peace; all members were appointed. From 1848, there were additional provincial Legislative Councils for New Ulster and New Munster. The general Legislative Council had twelve sessions, and the first ten were held in Auckland while the last two were held in Wellington. In May 1852, an act provided for two thirds of the membership of the provincial Legislative Councils to be elected. Elections for the New Ulster Province had already been held when news was received that the New Zealand Constitution Act 1852 had been passed by the Parliament of the United Kingdom. No meeting of the elected members was ever called. The New Zealand Constitution Act 1852 disestablished the Legislative Council when writs for the first election of members of the New Zealand House of Representatives were returned. The original Legislative Councils ceased to exist in September 1853.

The New Zealand Constitution Act 1852 created a bicameral general assembly consisting of the governor, a Legislative Council and a House of Representatives, an executive council (nominally appointed by the governor), and the Provinces of New Zealand (New Zealand was divided into six provinces).

General Legislative Council
The New Zealand Legislative Council was formed in 1841 by governor William Hobson. The Charter for Erecting the Colony of New Zealand took effect from 3 May 1841; at that time the capital of New Zealand had just shifted from Okiato (Old Russell) to Auckland. The first session of the New Zealand Legislative Council was held in Auckland from 24 May to 10 July 1841. The initial members were Hobson as governor, Willoughby Shortland as colonial secretary, Francis Fisher as attorney-general, George Cooper as colonial treasurer, and a number of JPs: William Wakefield, William Cornwallis Symonds, James Reddy Clendon, Edmund Halswell, and George Butler Earp.

James Coates was clerk to the general Legislative Council during the entire time of its existence.

Sessions of the general Legislative Council
The general Legislative Council sat for twelve sessions, with the third session split across two periods. The sessions in Wellington were held in a room in the court house:

Membership
The general Legislative Council had 41 members during its existence. Where membership was due to holding an office, this is identified in the table below. Members were entitled to the honorific prefix "Honourable". The last session of the council was adjourned in January 1853, and those who were present at this session, or not present but still held membership, are identified accordingly. There was no public announcement of the general Legislative Council having ceased to exist, but based on the New Zealand Constitution Acts and the date of writs received, it is likely that membership terminated on 28 September 1853.

Henry Tancred and William Deans were both invited in 1851 to represent Canterbury, but both declined.

Table footnotes
(1) member present during the twelfth session
(2) member not present during the twelfth session

Notes

References

Legislative Council, 1841–1853
Constitution of New Zealand
Parliament of New Zealand
Defunct upper houses
1841 establishments in New Zealand
1853 disestablishments in New Zealand